The ascending branch of medial circumflex femoral artery is a small artery in the thigh. It branches of the medial circumflex femoral artery and is distributed to the adductor muscles of the hip. It anastomoses with the obturator artery.

It also serves as an important blood supply to the head of the femur.

References

Arteries of the lower limb